was a Japanese business executive and politician.

Career
Kakuzo Kawamoto was born in Takashima District, Shiga on March 27, 1917. He graduated from Hikone Commercial College (later, Shiga University) in 1937. In 1946, he founded Yamashiro Orimono (later) and became the president.  In 1965, he founded  on the property of the  Kusatsu factory of Ayaha Spinning (later, Ayaha Corporation) for the junior high school graduates working for Ayaha Spinning.

He was elected as a member of the House of Councilors in 1971. He served as Vice Minister of International Trade and Industry, Vice Minister of Agriculture, Forestry and Forestry, Chairperson of Budget Committee of the House of Councilors.
 In 1987, he was awarded the Grand Cordon of the Order of the Sacred Treasure.

In 1989, he was defeated although he ran in the election from Liberal Democratic Party.

In 1980, his son, Hidenori Kawamoto who has served as the president of Ayaha Corporation, the chairperson of Ayaha High School, the vice chairperson of Ōtsu Chamber of Commerce and Industry, the chairperson of Shiga Sport Association and so on, established Public-interest Incorporated Foundation "Kawamoto Promotion Association for Educational Welfare" ("河本文教福祉振興会") for the purpose of contributing to the sound upbringing of children and youth in Shiga Prefecture according to the suggestion and benevolence of Kakuzo Kawamoto by donating his personal fortune.

His grandmother, Niwa Kawamoto (1863 - 1976) used to be the world's top  person for longevity.

References

External links
Public-interest Incorporated Foundation Kawamoto Promotion Association for Educational Welfare founded by Kakuzo Kawamoto donated a minivan to Special nursing home 'Senju no sato' in 2016 / Mainichi Shimbun

1917 births
1990 deaths
People from Shiga Prefecture
Shiga University alumni